Zelva District is a district (rajon) in Grodno Region of Belarus.

The administrative center is Zelva.

Notable residents 
Vasil Zacharka (1877–1943), Belarusian statesman and president of the Rada of the Belarusian Democratic Republic
 Raphael Lemkin (1900–1959), drafter of the Genocide Convention

References 

Districts of Grodno Region